Ini Aliaj (born 21 August 1996 in Vlorë) is an Albanian football player who currently plays for Flamurtari Vlorë in the Albanian Superliga.

References

1996 births
Living people
Footballers from Vlorë
Albanian footballers
Association football forwards
Flamurtari Vlorë players
KF Adriatiku Mamurrasi players
KS Shkumbini Peqin players
Kategoria Superiore players